Daniel S. Kecman Jr. (born June 10, 1948) is a former American football linebacker who played one season for the New England Patriots of the National Football League (NFL). He also was with the Denver Broncos and Cincinnati Bengals but did not play. He played college football at Maryland.

Early life and education
Kecman was born on June 10, 1948, in Pittsburgh, Pennsylvania. He went to North High School in West Mifflin, Pennsylvania, before attending University of Maryland. While at Maryland, he played football. He did not play football in his first year of college. In his second year, he played as a starter on their defense as Maryland finished without a single win. The next season, Kecman started in seven of the ten games, but was injured for the two wins that Maryland had. He would only win a game in the final game of his senior year, where Maryland won against Virginia, 17–14.

Professional career
Kecman was signed as an undrafted free agent following the 1970 NFL Draft by the New England Patriots. He only made one appearance with the team, in a 27–14 win over the Miami Dolphins. The next year he signed with the Denver Broncos but was waived. His final team was the Cincinnati Bengals, but he did not make any appearances.

References

1948 births
Living people
American football linebackers
Maryland Terrapins football players
New England Patriots players
People from West Mifflin, Pennsylvania
Players of American football from Pittsburgh